Reading Like a Writer is a writing guide by American writer Francine Prose, published in 2006.

Background
Subtitled "A Guide for People Who Love Books and for Those Who Want to Write Them," — Prose shares how she developed her writing craft through writing and reading. She uses examples from literature to demonstrate how fictional elements, such as character and dialogue, can be mastered.

Summary

 Chapter One: Close Reading
Prose discusses the question of whether writing can be taught. She answers the question by suggesting that although writing workshops can be helpful, the best way to learn to write is to read. Closely reading books, Prose studied word choice and sentence construction. Close reading helped her solve difficult obstacles in her own writing.

 Chapter Two: Words
Prose encourages the reader to slow down and read every word. She reminds the reader that words are the "raw material out of which literature is crafted." Challenging the reader to stop at every word, she suggests the following question be asked: "What is the writer trying to convey with this word?"

 Chapter Three: Sentences
Prose discusses how "the well made sentence transcends time and genre." She believes the writer who is concerned about what constitutes a well-constructed sentence is on the right path. Prose mentions the importance of mastering grammar and how it can improve the quality of a writer's sentence. In this chapter, she also discusses the use of long sentences, short sentences, and rhythm in prose.

 Chapter Four: Paragraphs
Prose discusses that, just as with sentence construction, the writer who is concerned about paragraph construction is stepping in the right direction. She states that the writer who reads widely will discover there are no general rules for building a well-constructed paragraph, but "only individual examples to help point [the writer] in a direction in which [the writer] might want to go."

 Chapter Five: Narration
When determining point of view, Prose says audience is an important factor. She gives examples from literature of point-of-view variations. First person and third person are discussed, and even an example of writing fiction in second person is given.

 Chapter Six: Character
Using examples from the works of Heinrich von Kleist and Jane Austen, Prose discusses how writers can develop characterization. She mentions that Kleist, in his "The Marquise of O—" ignores physical description of the characters, but instead "tells us just as much as we need to know about his characters, then releases them into the narrative that doesn't stop spinning until the last sentence . . ."  Excerpts from other pieces of literature are used to show how action, dialogue and even physical description can help develop characterization.

 Chapter Seven: Dialogue
Prose begins this chapter by dispelling the advice that writers should improve and clean up dialogue so it sounds less caustic than actual speech. She believes this idea on dialogue can be taken too far and that dialogue can be used to reveal not only the words on the surface, but the many motivations and emotions of the characters underneath the words.

 Chapter Eight: Details
Using examples from literature, Prose explains how one or two important details can leave a more memorable impression on the reader than a barrage of description.

 Chapter Nine: Gestures
Prose argues that gestures performed by fictional characters should not be "physical clichés" but illuminations that move the narrative.

 Chapter Ten: Learning from Chekhov
Prose gives examples of what she has learned from reading Anton Chekhov. As a creative writing teacher, she would disseminate advice to her students after reading their stories. As a fan of Chekhov, she would read his short stories and find examples of how he would successfully break the "rules" of fiction writing, contradicting something she recently told her students to do in their writing projects. Prose also discusses how Chekhov teaches the writer to write without judgment; she tells how Chekhov practiced not being the "judge of one's characters and their conversations but rather the unbiased observer."

 Chapter Eleven: Reading for Courage
Prose discusses the fears writers may have: revealing too much of themselves in their writing; resisting the pressures that writers must write a certain way; determining whether or not the act of writing is worth it when one considers the state of the world. She concludes her book by stating that the writer may fear creating "weeds" instead of "roses." Continuing the metaphor, she says reading is a way for the writer to see how other gardeners grow their roses.

 Books to Be Read Immediately
Prose includes a list of book recommendations, many of which have selections from those that are used as examples for the concepts she discusses.

Books to be Read

Here are the books in mostly chronological order. The chapters in which they are discussed are in italics.

 Sophocles (trans. Sir George Young) Oedipus Rex

 Anonymous (trans. Dorothy L. Sayers) The Song of Roland

 Miguel de Cervantes (trans. Tobias Smollett) Don Quixote

 William Shakespeare King Lear

 John Milton Paradise Lost

 Samuel Richardson Pamela: Or Virtue Rewarded

 Samuel Johnson The Life of Savage Sentences

 Edward Gibbon Decline and Fall of the Roman Empire

 Jane Austen Sense and Sensibility Paragraphs Character

 Jane Austen Pride and Prejudice Paragraphs Character

 Heinrich von Kleist (trans. Martin Greenberg) The Marquise of O---- and Other Stories Sentences Character

 Stendhal (trans. Roger Gard) The Red and the Black Paragraphs

 Honore de Balzac (trans. Kathleen Raine) Cousin Bette

 Nikolai Gogol (trans. Richard Pevear and Larissa Volokhonsky) Dead Souls: A Novel Courage

 Charles Dickens Dombey and Son Narration

 Charles Dickens Bleak House

 Emily Bronte Wuthering Heights

 Ivan Turgenev (trans. Isaiah Berlin) First Love

 George Eliot Middlemarch Character

 Herman Melville Bartleby, the Scrivener Paragraphs

 Herman Melville Moby Dick

 Herman Melville Benito Cereno

 Gustave Flaubert (trans. Geoffrey Wall) Madame Bovary Courage

 Gustave Flaubert (trans. Robert Baldick) Sentimental Education Character

 Fyodor Dostoyevsky (trans. Constance Garnett) Crime and Punishment Narration Courage

 Leo Tolstoy (trans. David McDuff) The Kreutzer Sonata and Other Stories

 Leo Tolstoy (trans. Aylmer Maude) The Death of Ivan Ilych and Other Stories Courage

 Leo Tolstoy (trans. Constance Garnett) Anna Karenina

 Leo Tolstoy (trans. Constance Garnett) War and Peace

 Leo Tolstoy (trans. Rosemary Edmonds) Resurrection

 Louisa May Alcott Little Women

 Mark Twain The Adventures of Huckleberry Finn Narration

 James Baldwin Vintage Baldwin Paragraphs

 Henry James The Portrait of a Lady Gesture

 Henry James The Turn of the Screw Narration

 Anton Chekhov (trans. Constance Garnett) Tales of Anton Chekhov: Volumes 1-13 Detail Gesture Chekhov Courage

 Anton Chekhov (trans. Constance Garnett) A Life in Letters Detail

 William Strunk The Elements of Style, Illustrated Sentences

 Marcel Proust (trans. Lydia Davis) Swann's Way Gesture

 Gertrude Stein The Autobiography of Alice B. Toklas Sentences

 Virginia Woolf On Being Ill Sentences

 James Joyce Dubliners Sentences Gesture

 Franz Kafka (trans. Malcolm Pasley) Metamorphosis and Other Stories Detail

 Franz Kafka The Judgement Gesture

 Franz Kafka In the Penal Colony

 Rex Stout Plot It Yourself Paragraphs

 Katherine Mansfield Collected Stories of Katherine Mansfield Words Gesture

 Raymond Chandler The Big Sleep Sentences Gesture

 Ryunosuke Akutagawa (trans. M. Kuwata and Tashaki Kojima) Rashomon and Other Stories

 Konstantin Paustovsky Years of Hope: The Story of a Life Paragraphs

 Rebecca West The Birds Fall Down Sentences

 Rebecca West Black Lamb and Grey Falcon: A Journey Through Yugoslavia Sentences

 Isaac Babel (trans. Walter Morrison) The Collected Stories Paragraphs Courage

 L. P. Hartley The Go-Between Gesture

 F. Scott Fitzgerald The Great Gatsby Words

 F. Scott Fitzgerald Tender is the Night Words

 Ernest Hemingway The Sun Also Rises Sentences

 Ernest Hemingway A Moveable Feast Sentences

 Elizabeth Bowen The House in Paris Detail

 Vladimir Nabokov Lectures on Russian Literature Chekhov

 Vladimir Nabokov Lolita Narration Dialogue

 Nadezhda Mandelstam Hope Against Hope: A Memoir Words

 Christina Stead The Man Who Loved Children Dialogue

 Henry Green Doting Dialogue

 Henry Green Loving Dialogue

 Samuel Beckett The Complete Short Prose, 1929-1989 Gesture Courage

 Francis Steegmuller Flaubert and Madame Bovary: A Double Portrait

 Paul Bowles Collected Stories and Later Writings

 John Cheever The Stories of John Cheever Sentences

 Randall Jarrell Pictures from an Institution

 Jane Bowles Two Serious Ladies Narration Dialogue

 Juan Rulfo (trans. Margaret Sayers Peden) Pedro Páramo Courage

 Peter Taylor A Summons to Memphis Narration

 J. D. Salinger Franny and Zooey Detail

 William Gaddis The Recognitions

 Mavis Gallant Paris Stories Narration

 Italo Calvino Cosmicomics

 Paula Fox Desperate Characters Paragraphs

 Zbigniew Herbert (trans. Czesław Miłosz and Peter Dale Scott) Selected Poems Courage

 Flannery O'Connor Wise Blood Narration Gesture

 Flannery O'Connor A Good Man Is Hard to Find and Other Stories Words

 Flannery O'Connor Collected Stories Detail

 Richard Yates Revolutionary Road Words

 Gabriel García Márquez One Hundred Years of Solitude Paragraphs

 Gabriel García Márquez The Autumn of the Patriarch Paragraphs

 William Trevor The Collected Stories

 William Trevor Fools of Fortune

 William Trevor The Children of Dynmouth

 Stanley Elkin Searches and Seizures Sentences

 Harold Brodkey Stories in an Almost Classical Mode Narration Dialogue

 Donald Barthelme Sixty Stories

 Alice Munro Selected Stories Words

 John le Carré A Perfect Spy Dialogue

 Philip Roth American Pastoral Sentences

 Philip Roth Novels and Stories 1959-1962 Gesture

 Diane Johnson Persian Nights Narration

 Diane Johnson Le Divorce Narration

 Thomas Pynchon Gravity's Rainbow

 Raymond Carver Where I'm Calling From: Selected Stories Sentences Paragraphs

 Raymond Carver Cathedral

 Stuart Dybek I Sailed with Magellan Narration

 Joy Williams Escapes Dialogue

 Scott Spencer A Ship Made of Paper

 Tim O'Brien The Things They Carried Sentences

 Charles Baxter Believers: A Novella and Stories Gesture

 David Gates The Wonders of the Invisible World: Stories Dialogue

 Denis Johnson Jesus' Son

 Denis Johnson Angels Paragraphs

 Tatyana Tolstaya Sleepwalker in a Fog Words

 Bruce Wagner I'm Losing You Character

 Jay McInerney Bright Lights, Big City Narration

 Jonathan Franzen The Corrections Paragraphs

 Deborah Eisenberg The Stories (So Far) of Deborah Eisenberg Narration

 Richard Price Freedomland Narration

 Edward St Aubyn Some Hope: A Trilogy Gesture

 Edward St Aubyn Mother's Milk Dialogue

 James Wood Broken Estates: Essays on Literature and Belief

 Junot Díaz Drown Gesture

 Gary Shteyngart The Russian Debutante's Handbook Paragraphs

 ZZ Packer Drinking Coffee Elsewhere Gesture

 Konstantin Paustovsky (trans. Joseph Barnes) Years of Hope: The Story of a Life

External links
Quotes by Francine Prose at Wikiquote
 Report and photos from reading at Strand (Nov 2006)
 The Quarterly Conversation review

2006 non-fiction books
Books about writing
HarperCollins books